KVMR (89.5 FM) is a progressive, largely independent radio station founded in 1978 in Nevada City, California producing mainly live broadcasts. Arthur Cohen was its first manager. The station motto is "If you didn't turn us on, we wouldn't be here".

For the initial years, its one studio and office location were at the Miner's Foundry. In 1996, it moved to larger leased premises nearby at 401 Spring Street. On February 24, 2015 the offices, production facilities, and infrastructure moved across the street to its new purpose-built facilities at 120 Bridge Street, for which funds were raised from an extensive and still ongoing capital campaign. Several new off-air production studios have been added to improve the artistic and technical quality of broadcasts. Increasing use is being made of the Internet for streaming and many shows are now both archived and podcast on its website and elsewhere to leverage social media and ongoing advances in technology, such as its Facebook group @KVMRFM.

The building itself backs onto the historic Nevada Theatre, with which the station now has a cooperative venture called "The Bridge Street Project". The new modern building maintains the old gold-mining feel of the historic district through the choice of materials and appearance, preserving the atmosphere of the small-town mid-19th-century gold rush community from which Nevada City grew.

It is rebroadcast by several translators (shown below). The station is the area's local Emergency Broadcast System. The signal covers the central parts of the foothills of the Sierra Nevada mountain range, as well as central areas of the Central Valley region around the state capital, Sacramento.

The station principally serves its community of listeners with eclectic music genres. A substantial number of programming slots are for public affairs programming, educational, scientific, and non-mainstream  interviews, local and international news, and alternative points of view on topics of interest to listeners as seen in its online surveys and outreach. Call-ins to most shows are possible on the studio line and about a dozen shows a week are exclusively call-in, such as the "Flea Market" and tech show "Zen Tech". Nationally syndicated Democracy Now! is currently at 7 p.m. weeknights.

KVMR has over 250 volunteer broadcasters with wide-ranging tastes and expertise, including Jima Abbott, Annie O'Day Hestbeck, Hap Hazard, Larry Hillberg, Jim "Winfield" Wilson, Micheal Keene, The Breningers, Connie Coale, Eric Rice, Che Greenwood, and poet Molly Fisk. Utah Phillips produced "Loafer's Glory" from this station before his death in 2008.

There is also a large cadre of event and office volunteers and a small staff. Funding comes from listeners, underwriters, events, donations, and grants. KVMR's radio shows are largely its own productions engineered by the many certified broadcasters. Relatively few shows are sourced outside the station, in contrast to most public radio stations.

Local and world nightly news, currently at 6 p.m., has been produced and aired for over 15 years. The station live-streams shows like its own Celtic Music Festival, Strawberry Music Festival, California Bluegrass Association's Father's Day Bluegrass Festival, live events from various venues like Nevada County Fairgrounds, Music In The Mountains, the Center for the Arts (Grass Valley), Worldfest, as well as Palms Public Playhouse in Winters, Sierra Nevada Brewing Company's Big Room in Chico, the High Sierra Music Festival in Quincy, American River Music Festival in Cool, and many community  "town hall" meetings as well as live show broadcasts from all over the area.

Translators
In addition to simulcasting on KCPC (88.3 FM, Camino), KVMR is rebroadcast by several broadcast relay stations (translators):

See also
List of community radio stations in the United States

External links
Official Website

KVMR's Broadband Internet Stream
KVMR's lower rate Internet Stream

VMR
Community radio stations in the United States
Radio stations established in 1978
1978 establishments in California